The 1989 Northern Iowa Panthers football team represented the University of Northern Iowa in the 1989 NCAA Division I-AA football season. The Panthers offense scored 302 points while the defense allowed 211 points.

Schedule

Roster

Team players drafted into the NFL

Redshirted quarterback Kurt Warner would go on to an NFL career in which he played for the St. Louis Rams, New York Giants, and Arizona Cardinals.

References

Northern Iowa
Northern Iowa Panthers football seasons
Northern Iowa Panthers football